Robert "Bertie" Campbell (born 25 April 1971) is a former Russia international rugby league footballer. A utility player, he was a hooker at school, but played professionally as a prop. Campbell played for Brisbane's Western Suburbs Panthers before signing for Sydney's Western Suburbs Magpies. He later played for Illawarra Steelers and the Gold Coast Chargers.

Background
Campbell was born in Brisbane, Queensland, Australia. He is of Russian descent from part of his grandfather, Joseph, who left the USSR at least after World War II

Playing career
Campbell was also selected from the Redcliffe Dolphins to play for the Russian national side during the 2000 World Cup, qualifying for the Bears via the grandparent rule. Campbell grubber-kicked for Russia's only try, scored by Matt Donovan, in their Test match against Australia, a game that ended in a record 110-4 defeat for the Russians.  According to commentator Andrew Voss, author of Stuff You May Have Missed, the Russian mafia allegedly offered Campbell and Donovan huge sums of money in exchange for agreeing to play for the Russian national team in the tournament.

Post playing
Today, Campbell teaches at Roachedale Primary School.

References

External links
Robert Campbell player profile
Widnes History Website - Player Profile

1971 births
Living people
Australian people of Russian descent
Australian rugby league players
Gold Coast Chargers players
Redcliffe Dolphins players
Rugby articles needing expert attention
Rugby league players from Brisbane
Russia national rugby league team players
Western Suburbs Magpies NSW Cup players
Wests Panthers players